Bağcılar is a village in the Artvin District, Artvin Province, Turkey. Its population is 94 (2021).

References

Villages in Artvin District

tr:Bağcılar